Kavaklıdere may refer to:

 Kavaklıdere, Ankara, a metropolitan district of Turkey's capital city, Ankara
 Kavaklıdere, Aziziye
 Kavaklıdere, Muğla, a district of Muğla Province of Turkey
 Kavaklıdere, İzmir, a village in Bornova district of İzmir Province, Turkey
 Kavaklıdere (wine), a Turkish wine brand, found in Ankara